Richard (Dick) L. Allington is an American scholar who was a Professor of Education at the  University of Tennessee at Knoxville from 2005 until his retirement in 2017. 

Allington served as the President of the International Reading Association (IRA), as President of the National Reading Conference, and as a member of the International Reading Association Board of Directors.

Biography

Allington grew up on a dairy farm in rural Michigan and attended a one-room schoolhouse through 6th grade. He graduated from Cedar Springs High School in 1965 and went on to Western Michigan University to become a teacher.  After graduating from Western Michigan University in 1968 with his Elementary Education and Social Science degree, he became a 4th and 5th-grade classroom teacher. Experiencing difficulty in dealing with students needing remedial reading instruction,  he completed his Master of Arts in Reading degree in 1969, and moved on to become to the Title I Director for Belding Area Schools in Michigan. Although he had plans to eventually become a superintendent, his experiences during his doctoral study refocused his attention on academia and research. In 1973 he earned his Ph.D. in Elementary and Special Education from Michigan State University and has since achieved a scholarly career in the fields of literacy and education.

1969–1973, Ph.D., Michigan State University, Elementary and Special Education
1968–1969, M.A., Western Michigan University, Reading Education
1965–1968, B.A., Western Michigan University, Social Science/Elementary Education

Career

2017-present, Professor emeritus, University of Tennessee at Knoxville
2005-2017, Professor Education, University of Tennessee at Knoxville
2000–2004, Fien Distinguished Professor of Education, University of Florida
1995–1999, Chair, Department of Reading & Senior Research Scientist National Research Center for English Learning and Achievement University at Albany, SUNY
1989–1999, Professor, Teaching and Research, University at Albany, SUNY
1987–1989, Director, Center for Teaching Effectiveness, State University of New York at Albany,
1982–1988, Chair, Department of Reading, State University of New York at Albany
1981, Visiting Professor/Teaching, Eastern Montana College
1978–1981, Associate Professor/Teaching and Research, State University of New York at Albany
1976, Visiting Professor/Teaching, University of  Minnesota
1973–1978, Assistant Professor/Teaching and Research, State University of New York at Albany
1971–1973, Graduate Assistant and Lecturer, 	Michigan State
1969–1971, Title I Director/reading teacher, Belding Area Schools, MI
1968–1969, Classroom Teacher, Grade 4/5, Kent City Schools, MI

Publications
 Allington, Richard L. & Patricia Cunningham, Schools that Work: Where All Children Learn to Read, Pearson, 2006.
 Allington, Richard, L. Response to Intervention: Research-Based Designs, Pearson, 2008
 McGill-Franzen, Anne M. & Allington, Richard L. Handbook of Reading Disabilities Research, Routledge, 2010
 Allington, Richard, L. What Really Matters for Struggling Readers: Designing Research-Based Programs, Pearson, 2012
 Allington, Richard L. & McGill-Franzen, Anne M. Summer Reading: Closing the Rich/Poor Reading Achievement Gap, Teachers College Press, 2013
 Pressley, Michael & Richard L. Allington, "Reading Instruction that Works: The Case for Balanced Teaching", Guilford Press, 2014.
 Cunningham, Patricia & Allington, Richard L., Classrooms that Work: Where All Children Read and Write, Pearson, 2015.

References

Living people
American educational theorists
Year of birth missing (living people)
University of Tennessee faculty
Presidents of the International Literacy Association